Gerardine Mary "Ged" Kearney (born 29 October 1963) is an Australian politician and trade unionist. She has been a member of the House of Representatives since March 2018, representing the Division of Batman and later the Division of Cooper for the Labor Party. She was previously president of the Australian Council of Trade Unions (ACTU) from 2010 to 2018.

Early life
Kearney was born in Richmond, Melbourne, Victoria, as the second-youngest of nine children. Her father was a publican. She began to study for a Bachelor of Economics degree at Monash University, but dropped out to pursue a nursing career. She qualified as a registered nurse in 1985 and participated in the nurses' strike in 1986. She also gained a Bachelor of Education, and worked as a nurse and nurse educator, including a period managing clinical nurse education at Austin Health.

Kearney has four children.

Union movement
Kearney was elected as an official of the Australian Nursing Federation in 1997.  She served as Assistant Federal Secretary, Federal President and Victorian Branch President, before being appointed Federal Secretary of the Federation in April 2008. Following the departure of Sharan Burrow, Kearney was elected President of the Australian Council of Trade Unions from 1 July 2010.

Politics
In May 2013, Kearney indicated she was considering nominating for Labor preselection for the Division of Batman at the 2013 federal election. The seat was to become vacant following the retirement of Martin Ferguson. However, a short time later she announced that she would not run.

In 2017, Kearney announced she would seek preselection for the state seat of Brunswick, after the decision by the sitting member Jane Garrett to try to move to a safe seat in the Legislative Council. Garrett's bid was unsuccessful.

In February 2018, following the resignation of David Feeney from the seat of Batman, Kearney was selected by the ALP to contest the resulting by-election. She won the by-election on 17 March 2018 and was declared elected on Wednesday 21 March 2018.  Kearney used her maiden speech to advocate for a "humane refugee policy" in Australia.

In 2019, Kearney was elected to the new Division of Cooper on a substantially increased two party preferred margin. The post-redistribution boundaries of the Division of Cooper are almost identical to the former Division of Batman.

Following the 2019 federal election, newly-elected Leader of the Opposition Anthony Albanese appointed Kearney to his Shadow Ministry as Shadow Assistant Minister for Skills and Shadow Assistant Minister for Aged Care. Following a Shadow Cabinet reshuffle in 2021, Kearney was appointed Shadow Assistant Minister for Health and Ageing.

Kearney was re-elected at the 2022 federal election, and was subsequently appointed Assistant Minister for Health and Aged Care by Prime Minister Anthony Albanese. In December 2022, she was appointed to chair the newly formed National Women’s Health Advisory Council which was established to look at ways of improving health outcomes for women and girls.

References

1963 births
Living people
Australian nurses
Trade unionists from Melbourne
Australian women nurses
Labor Left politicians
Members of the Australian House of Representatives
Members of the Australian House of Representatives for Batman
Members of the Australian House of Representatives for Cooper
Australian Labor Party members of the Parliament of Australia
Women members of the Australian House of Representatives
Monash University alumni
Australian people of Irish descent